Kaushal Dewara (born 4 June 1975) is an Indian first-class cricketer who represented Rajasthan. He made his first-class debut for Rajasthan in the 1997-98 Ranji Trophy on 5 November 1997.

References

External links
 

1975 births
Living people
Indian cricketers
Rajasthan cricketers